Ammonoceratites is an extinct genus of ammonoid cephalopod known from the Albian (upper Lower Cretaceous) of British Columbia, Madagascar, New Zealand, and Japan, included in the Lytoceratidae.

The shell of Ammonoceratites is evolute, smooth, moderately expanded; the inner rim (dorsum) only slightly impressed; whorl section subcircular. It is similar to that of Lytoceras which has transverse ribbing and to that of Pictetia which is gyroconic (whorls not touching) and more strongly expanded.

References

Arkell et al., 1957. Mesozoic Ammonoidea, Treatise on Invertebrate Paleontology, Part L; Geological Society of America and University of Kansas press.  
C. W. Wright, J. H. Calloman, and M. K. Howarth. 1996. Cretaceous Ammonoidea. Treatise on Invertebrate Paleontology revised L(4):1-362

Early Cretaceous ammonites
Prehistoric animals of Madagascar
Ammonitida genera
Lytoceratidae
Albian genera
Fossils of British Columbia
Fossils of New Zealand
Fossils of Japan